The 1934 Kentucky State Thorobreds football team was an American football team that represented Kentucky State Industrial College (now known as Kentucky State University) as a member of the Midwest Athletic Association (MAA) during the 1934 college football season. In their fourth season under head coach Henry Kean, the team compiled an 8–0 record, won the MAA championship, shut out seven of eight opponents, and outscored all opponents by a total of 193 to 2. The team was recognized as the black college national champion. The team played its home games at Alumni Field in Frankfort, Kentucky.

Schedule

References

Kentucky State
Kentucky State Thorobreds football seasons
Black college football national champions
College football undefeated seasons
Kentucky State Thorobreds football